Erik Hell (11 August 1911 – 11 March 1973) was a Swedish actor. Hell was born in Kalliokoski, Finland, to a Norwegian father and a Finnish mother. He moved to Sweden with his family in 1918 during the Finnish Civil War. He married the actress Öllegård Wellton in 1960.

Selected filmography

 Blossom Time (1940) - Miner (uncredited)
 Snapphanar (1941) - Swedish soldier (uncredited)
 The Yellow Clinic (1942) - First Mate (uncredited)
 Ride Tonight! (1942) - Hans of Lenhovda
 The Heavenly Play (1942) - Jon Persson
 There's a Fire Burning (1943) - Jodl (uncredited)
 Kungajakt (1944) - Möllersten
 The Old Clock at Ronneberga (1944) - Lieutenant Gerhard Grijp
 Live Dangerously (1944) - Parachuting Saboteur
 The Invisible Wall (1944) - Walter Corell
 Oss tjuvar emellan eller En burk ananas (1945) - Nisse, sailor (uncredited)
 Money (1946) - Fireman (uncredited)
 The Balloon (1946) - The Lover
 When the Meadows Blossom (1946) - Stenström
 Barbacka (1946) - Johan
 The Loveliest Thing on Earth (1947) - Bengt Kahlman
 A Ship to India (1947) - Pekka
 Det kom en gäst... (1947) - Edvin
 On These Shoulders (1948) - Aron Loväng
 Port of Call (1948) - Berit's Father
 Realm of Man (1949) - Aron Loväng
 Stora Hoparegränd och himmelriket (1949) - Erik Andersson
 Kranes konditori (1951) - Stivhatten
 One Summer of Happiness (1951) - Torsten, Farm Worker
 Sköna Helena (1951) - Slave Driver
 U-Boat 39 (1952) - First Mate
 The Clang of the Pick (1952) - Johan
 For the Sake of My Intemperate Youth (1952) - Blind Musician
 Barabbas (1953) - Man at Jerusalem (uncredited)
 Bread of Love (1953) - Bouncer
 The Chieftain of Göinge (1953) - Red Nils
 Enchanted Walk (1954) - Strong Man
 Storm Over Tjurö (1954) - Vicar
 Salka Valka (1954) - Customs Inspector
 La Sorcière (1956) - Pullinen
 A Dreamer's Journey (1957) - Erik Axel Blom
 Rider in Blue (1959) - Kurt Forsberg
 Lovely Is the Summer Night (1961) - Egon Ström
 Pärlemor (1961) - Hilmer Persson
 Adventures of Nils Holgersson (1962) - The Hunter
 Det är hos mig han har varit (1963) - Drunken Man
 491 (1964) - Policeman
 Dear John (1964) - Yngve Lindgren
 Morianna (1965) - Ragnar Synnéus
 I, a Woman (1965) - Siv's Father
 Ön (1966) - Pettersson
 Mördaren - en helt vanlig person (1967) - Tryggve Holm
 Tofflan (1967) - Uno
 The Vicious Circle (1967) - The Father
 Vindingevals (1968) - Oskar Kron
 Carmilla (1968) - Gunnar Wahlström
 Komedi i Hägerskog (1968) - Väg-Larsen
 The Rite (1969, TV Movie) - Judge Dr. Abrahamson
 The Passion of Anna (1969) - Johan Andersson
 Ann and Eve (1970) - Col. Braun

References

External links

1911 births
1973 deaths
20th-century Swedish male actors
Finnish emigrants to Sweden
Naturalized citizens of Sweden
Swedish people of Finnish descent
Swedish people of Norwegian descent